"Warm Leatherette" is a song by Daniel Miller's project the Normal, released in 1978.

The Normal original

Overview
The lyrics of "Warm Leatherette" reference J. G. Ballard's controversial 1973 novel Crash, which had heavily influenced Daniel Miller. Together with his college friend he had worked on a film script based on the book, but after the project was abandoned Miller decided to "write a song encapsulating [the script] in 2 and a half minutes". The song was recorded in Miller's apartment using two Revox B-77 tape machines. A series of sawtooth waves were recorded on a Korg 700S synthesizer.

Miller took the record to a few independent music shops, including Rough Trade in London, where it would be played to customers. "Warm Leatherette" was released as the B-side to "T.V.O.D.", the only single by Miller's musical project the Normal, and the very first release on his Mute Records label. However, since it was "Warm Leatherette" that gained more public attention, it was featured as the lead song on subsequent single re-releases. Although Miller did not expect the single to be successful, it sold 30,000 copies.

The single was an early example of industrial and synth-pop music, emerging on a wave of numerous electronic pop experiments of the late 1970s in the UK. It has since been described as having "revolutionised electronic music with its punk aesthetic, stark sound and dark subject matter" and has been covered by numerous artists. The song is featured in the 2020 American horror film Antebellum.

Track listing
7-inch single
A. "T.V.O.D." – 2:51
B. "Warm Leatherette" – 3:20

CD single
A. "Warm Leatherette" – 3:24
B. "T.V.O.D." – 2:52

Grace Jones version

Grace Jones recorded "Warm Leatherette" for her 1980 album of the same name. The song was released as a promotional 12-inch single. In 1981, it served as the opening song of her A One Man Show tour.

Track listing
12-inch single
A1. "Warm Leatherette" – 4:25
A2. "Love Is the Drug" – 7:15
B1. "The Hunter Gets Captured by the Game" – 3:50
B2. "Bullshit" – 5:20

Chart performance

References

1978 debut singles
1980 singles
Song recordings produced by Daniel Miller
Grace Jones songs
Industrial songs
Vehicle wreck ballads
1978 songs
Mute Records singles
Island Records singles